Concentrative nucleoside transporter 1 (CNT1) is a protein that in humans is encoded by the SLC28A1 gene.

See also 
 Concentrative nucleoside transporters
 Nucleoside transporters
 Solute carrier family

References

Further reading 

Solute carrier family